Geoje Ban clan is a Korean clan.

Their Bon-gwan is in Geoje, South Gyeongsang Province. As of 2015, Geoje Ban contained 12 814 members. After passing the Imperial examination with the top result, Ban bu attended Hanlin Academy, and worked as minister of civil service affairs (吏部尚書, Lìbu Shangshu) in the Song dynasty during the reign of Emperor Lizong.

After this, Ban bu entered Goryeo kingdom as a fatherly master of Princess Jeguk, who had an marriage to an ordinary person planned by Chungnyeol of Goryeo and worked as Jeongdang munhak. Ban bu also joined in with the Mongol invasions of Japan due to ’s command. Ban bu retired at 65 years old.

Ban bu died in Geoje. His descendant officially started Geoje Ban clan.

See also 
 Korean clan names of foreign origin

References

External links 
 

 
Ban clans
Korean clan names of Chinese origin